Leiopathes is a genus of hexacorallians belonging to the anthozoan clade Antipatharia. It is the only genus in the Leiopathidae family. The genus name means "smooth disease".

Species
 Leiopathes acanthophora Opresko, 1998
 Leiopathes annosa Wagner and Opresko, 2015
 Leiopathes bullosa Opresko, 1998
 Leiopathes expansa Johnson, 1899
 Leiopathes glaberrima (Esper, 1788)
 Leiopathes grimaldii Roule, 1902
 Leiopathes montana Molodtsova, 2011
 Leiopathes secunda  Opresko, 1998
 Leiopathes valdiviae (Pax, 1915)

References

Leiopathidae
Hexacorallia genera